Young Lady Chatterley is an American 1977 softcore pornographic film directed by Alan Roberts and starring Harlee McBride, Peter Ratray, and Lawrence Montaigne. The film was followed by a sequel in 1985, Young Lady Chatterley II.

Premise
Cynthia Chatterley, the niece of Lady Chatterley, inherits her estate. There, she finds her diary and learns that she had an affair with her gardener. Inspired by this revelation, the betrothed Cynthia decides to have affair with her own gardener.

Cast 

 Harlee McBride as Cynthia Chatterley
 Peter Ratray as Paul the gardener
 William Beckley as Phillip, Cynthia's fiancé 
 Mary Forbes as Frances Chatterley
 Ann Michelle as Gwen
 Lawrence Montaigne as Carl, the chauffeur

References

External links

1977 films
1970s English-language films
American erotic films
1970s erotic films
Films based on Lady Chatterley's Lover
1970s American films